Brookula iki is a species of sea snail, a marine gastropod mollusk, unassigned in the superfamily Seguenzioidea.

Description
The height of the shell attains 15 mm.

Distribution
This species occurs in the Indian Ocean off Réunion and in the Pacific Ocean off Hawaii.

References

External links
 To ITIS
 To World Register of Marine Species
 

iki
Gastropods described in 1979